Bruno Correia Mendes (born 10 December 1994), known as Bruno Ramírez, is a Bissau-Guinean professional footballer who plays as a midfielder for Differdange 03 and the Guinea-Bissau national team.

Club career
Ramírez is a youth product of SC Lavradiense, Barreirense, Fabril and GDR Portugal Moita. He began his senior career with Portugal Moita in 2012, and spent his early career with various semi-pro Portuguese clubs including União Banheirense,  União Santiago, União Santiago, Sesimbra, GD Alfarim, Loures, and Oriental Dragon FC. He transferred to the Luxembourgian club Etzella Ettelbruck in 2018, and after a couple seasons there moved to RM Hamm Benfica on 19 May 2021. He moved to Fola Esch in the summer of 2022, and helped them play matches in the UEFA Europa League.

International career
Born in Portugal, Ramírez is of Bissau-Guinean descent. He made his international debut with the Guinea-Bissau national team in a friendly 1–1 tie with Martinique on 24 September 2022.

References

External links
 
 
 Bild Profile

1994 births
Living people
Sportspeople from Cascais
Bissau-Guinean footballers
Guinea-Bissau international footballers
Portuguese footballers
Portuguese people of Bissau-Guinean descent
Association football midfielders
G.D. Sesimbra footballers
GS Loures players
Oriental Dragon FC players
FC Etzella Ettelbruck players
FC RM Hamm Benfica players
Campeonato de Portugal (league) players
Luxembourg National Division players
Bissau-Guinean expatriate footballers
Bissau-Guinean expatriates in Luxembourg
Expatriate footballers in Luxembourg